Radek Bejbl (born 29 August 1972) is a Czech former professional footballer who played as a defensive midfielder. He notably played four seasons with Atlético Madrid and played in the UEFA Euro 1996 final with the Czech Republic national team.

Club career
Born in Nymburk, Bejbl made his professional debuts with SK Slavia Prague, being a first-team regular since the age of 18. In 1991–92, he scored a career-best nine goals in 28 games as the capital side finished in fourth position.

In the 1996 summer, Bejbl moved to Spain and signed with Atlético Madrid, appearing in 33 matches in his first season in La Liga and eventually helping the Colchoneros to consecutive Copa del Rey finals (both lost). He left the club in 2000, after it suffered relegation.

Subsequently, Bejbl signed with RC Lens in the French Ligue 1, 25 of his 26 league appearances being made in his first season as they narrowly avoided relegation. Subsequently, he returned to former team Slavia for three additional campaigns.

Bejbl spent two years in Austria with SK Rapid Wien, playing 27 Bundesliga games in his second year to help to a fourth-place finish and qualification to the UEFA Intertoto Cup. Aged 35, he returned to his country for one final season with FC Slovan Liberec.

International career
Bejbl played 56 matches and scored three goals for Czech Republic, participating at UEFA Euro 1996 and Euro 2000. In the former competition, he started in all the games as the nation reached the final, netting in a 2–1 group stage win against Italy.

Bejbl's debut occurred on 8 May 1995, in a 1–1 friendly with Slovenia. Previously, he appeared in two games for Czechoslovakia.

References

External links

1972 births
Living people
People from Nymburk
Czechoslovak footballers
Czech footballers
Association football midfielders
Czechoslovakia international footballers
Czech Republic international footballers
Czechoslovakia under-21 international footballers
Dual internationalists (football)
UEFA Euro 1996 players
1997 FIFA Confederations Cup players
UEFA Euro 2000 players
Czech First League players
La Liga players
Ligue 1 players
Austrian Football Bundesliga players
SK Slavia Prague players
FC Slovan Liberec players
Atlético Madrid footballers
RC Lens players
SK Rapid Wien players
Czech expatriate footballers
Czech expatriate sportspeople in Spain
Expatriate footballers in Spain
Czech expatriate sportspeople in France
Expatriate footballers in France
Czech expatriate sportspeople in Austria
Expatriate footballers in Austria
Sportspeople from the Central Bohemian Region